The Umayyad Mosque, also known as the Great Mosque of Damascus, located in the old city of Damascus, the capital of Syria, is one of the largest and oldest mosques in the world. Its religious importance stems from the eschatological reports concerning the mosque, and historic events associated with it. Christian and Muslim tradition alike consider it the burial place of John the Baptist's head, a tradition originating in the 6th century. Muslim tradition holds that the mosque will be the place Jesus will return before the End of Days. Two shrines inside the premises commemorate the Islamic prophet Muhammad's grandson Husayn ibn Ali, whose martyrdom is frequently compared to that of John the Baptist and Jesus.

The site has been used as a house of worship since the Iron Age, when the Arameans built on it a temple dedicated to their god of rain, Hadad. Under Roman rule, beginning in 64 CE, it was converted into the center of the imperial cult of Jupiter, the Roman god of rain, becoming one of the largest temples in Syria. When the empire in Syria transitioned to Christian Byzantine rule, Emperor Theodosius I transformed it into a cathedral and the seat of the second-highest ranking bishop in the Patriarchate of Antioch.

After the Muslim conquest of Damascus in 634, part of the cathedral was designated as a small prayer house (musalla) for the Muslim conquerors. As the Muslim community grew, the Umayyad caliph al-Walid I confiscated the rest of the cathedral for Muslim use, returning to the Christians other properties in the city as compensation. The structure was largely demolished and a grand congregational mosque complex was built in its place. The new structure was built over nine years by thousands of laborers and artisans from across the Islamic and Byzantine empires at considerable expense and was funded by the war booty of Umayyad conquests and taxes on the Arab troops of Damascus. Unlike the simpler mosques of the time, the Umayyad Mosque had a large basilical plan with three parallel aisles and a perpendicular central nave leading from the mosque's entrance to the world's second concave mihrab (prayer niche).

Under Abbasid rule (750–860), new structures were added, including the Dome of the Treasury and the Minaret of the Bride, while the Mamluks (1260–1516) undertook major restoration efforts and added the Minaret of Qaytbay. The Umayyad Mosque innovated and influenced nascent Islamic architecture, with other major mosque complexes, including the Great Mosque of Cordoba in Spain and the al-Azhar Mosque of Egypt, based on its model. Although the original structure has been altered several times due to fire, war damage, and repairs, it is one of the few mosques to maintain the same form and architectural features of its 8th-century construction, as well as its Umayyad character.

History

Pre-Islamic period

The site of the Umayyad Mosque is attested for as a place of worship since the Iron Age. Damascus was the capital of the Aramaean state Aram-Damascus and a large temple was dedicated to Hadad-Ramman, the god of thunderstorms and rain, and was erected at the site of the present-day mosque. One stone remains from the Aramaean temple, dated to the rule of King Hazael, and is currently on display in the National Museum of Damascus.

The Temple of Hadad-Ramman continued to serve a central role in the city, and when the Roman Empire conquered Damascus in 64 BCE, they assimilated Hadad with their own god of thunder, Jupiter. Thus, they engaged in a project to reconfigure and expand the temple under the direction of Damascus-born architect Apollodorus, who created and executed the new design.

The new Temple of Jupiter became the center of the imperial cult of Jupiter and was served as a response to the Second Temple in Jerusalem. The Temple of Jupiter would attain further additions during the early Roman period, mostly initiated by high priests who collected contributions from the wealthy citizens of Damascus. The eastern gateway of the courtyard was expanded during the reign of Septimius Severus. By the 4th century, the temple was especially renowned for its size and beauty. It was separated from the city by two sets of walls. The first, wider wall spanned a wide area that included a market, and the second wall surrounded the actual sanctuary of Jupiter. It was the largest temple in Roman Syria.

In 391, the Temple of Jupiter was converted into a cathedral by the Christian emperor Theodosius I. It served as the seat of the Bishop of Damascus, who ranked second within the Patriarchate of Antioch after the patriarch himself.

Umayyad construction

Foundation and construction 

Damascus was captured by Muslim Arab forces led by Khalid ibn al-Walid in 634. In 661, the Islamic Caliphate came under the rule of the Umayyad dynasty, which chose Damascus to be the administrative capital of the Muslim world. The Byzantine cathedral had remained in use by the local Christians, but a prayer room (musalla) for Muslims was constructed on the southeastern part of the building. The musalla did not have the capacity to house the rapidly growing number of Muslim worshippers in Damascus. The city otherwise lacked sufficient free space for a large congregational mosque. The sixth Umayyad caliph, al-Walid I (r. 705–715), resolved to construct such a mosque on the site of the cathedral in 706.

Al-Walid personally supervised the project and had most of the cathedral, including the musalla, demolished. The construction of the mosque completely altered the layout of the building, though it preserved the outer walls of the temenos (sanctuary or inner enclosure) of the Roman-era temple. While the church (and the temples before it) had the main building located at the centre of the rectangular enclosure, the mosque's prayer hall is placed against its south wall. The architect recycled the columns and arcades of the church, dismantling and repositioning them in the new structure. Professor Alain George has re-examined the architecture and design of this first mosque on the site via three previously untranslated poems and the descriptions of medieval scholars. Besides its use as a large congregational mosque for the Damascenes, the new house of worship was meant as a tribute to the city.

In response to Christian protest at the move, al-Walid ordered all the other confiscated churches in the city to be returned to the Christians as compensation. The mosque was completed in 711, or in 715, shortly after al-Walid's death, by his successor, Sulayman ibn Abd al-Malik. According to 10th-century Persian historian Ibn al-Faqih, somewhere between 600,000 and 1,000,000 gold dinars were spent on the project. The historian Khalid Yahya Blankinship notes that the field army of Damascus, numbering some 45,000 soldiers, were taxed a quarter of their salaries for nine years to pay for its construction. Coptic craftsmen as well as Persian, Indian, Greek, and Moroccan laborers provided the bulk of the labor force which consisted of 12,000 people.

Layout design 

The plan of the new mosque was innovative and highly influential in the history of early Islamic architecture. The earliest mosques before this had been relatively plain hypostyle structures (a flat-roof hall supported by columns), but the new mosque in Damascus introduced a more basilical plan with three parallel aisles and a perpendicular central nave. The central nave, which leads from the main entrance to the mihrab (niche in the qibla wall) and features a central dome, provided a new aesthetic focus which may have been designed to emphasize the area originally reserved for the caliph during prayers, near the mihrab. There is some uncertainty as to whether the dome was originally directly in front of the mihrab (as in many later mosques) or in its current position mid-way along the central nave. Scholars have attributed the design of the mosque's plan to the influences of Byzantine Christian basilicas in the region. Rafi Grafman and Myriam Rosen-Ayalon have argued that the first Umayyad Al-Aqsa Mosque built in Jerusalem, begun by Abd al-Malik (al-Walid's father) and now replaced by later constructions, had a layout very similar to the current Umayyad Mosque in Damascus and that it probably served as a model for the latter. 

The mosque initially had no minaret towers, as this feature of mosque architecture was not established until later. However, at least two of the corners of the mosque's outer wall had short towers, platforms, or roof shelters which were used by the muezzin to issue the call to prayer (adhān), constituting a type of proto-minaret. These features were referred to as a mi'd͟hana ("place of the adhān") or as a ṣawma῾a ("monk's cell", due to their small size) in historical Arabic sources. Arabic sources indicated that they were former Roman towers which already stood at the corners of the temenos before the mosque's construction and were simply left intact and reused after construction.

Decoration 

The mosque was richly decorated. A rich composition of marble paneling covered the lower walls, though only minor examples of the original marbles have survived today near the east gate. The walls of the prayer hall were raised above the level of the old temenos walls, which allowed for new windows to be inserted in the upper walls. The windows had ornately carved grilles that foreshadowed the styles of windows in later Islamic architecture. 

The most celebrated decorative element of all was the revetment of mosaics, which originally covered much of the courtyard and the interior hall. The best-preserved remains are still visible in the courtyard today. Byzantine artisans were employed to create the mosaics, which depict landscapes and buildings in a characteristic late Roman style. They reflected a wide variety of artistic styles used by mosaicists and painters since the 1st century CE, but the combined use of all these different styles in the same place was innovative at the time. Similar to the Dome of the Rock, built earlier by Abd al-Malik, vegetation and plants were the most common motif, but those of the Damascus mosque are more naturalistic. In addition to the large landscape depictions, a mosaic frieze with an intricate vine motif (referred to as the karma in Arabic historical sources) once ran around the walls of the prayer hall, above the level of the mihrab. The only notable omission is the absence of human and animal figures, which was likely a new restriction imposed by the Muslim patron. Scholars have long debated the meaning of the mosaic imagery. Some historical Muslim writers and some modern scholars have interpreted them as a representation of all the cities in the known world (or within the Umayyad Caliphate at the time), while other scholars interpret them as a depiction of Paradise.

The mihrab 

The original mihrab was one of the first concave mihrabs in the Islamic world, the second one known to exist after the one created in 706–707 during al-Walid's reconstruction of the Prophet's Mosque in Medina. The exact appearance of the mosque's original main mihrab is uncertain, due to the multiple repairs and restorations that took place over the centuries. Ibn Jubayr, who visited the mosque in 1184, described the inside of the mihrab as filled with miniature blind arcades whose arches resembled "small mihrabs", each filled with inlaid mother-of-pearl mosaics and framed by spiral columns of marble. This mihrab was famed across the Islamic world for its beauty, as noted by other writers of the era. Its appearance may have been imitated by other surviving mihrabs built under the Mamluk sultans al-Mansur Qalawun and al-Nasir Muhammad in the 13th and 14th centuries, such as the richly-decorated mihrab of Qalawun's mausoleum in Cairo (completed in 1285). Scholars generally assume that the mihrab described by Ibn Jubayr dated from a restoration of the mosque in 1082. Another restoration occurred after 1401 and this version, which survived until another fire in 1893, was again decorated with miniature arcades, while its semi-dome was filled with coffering similar to Roman architecture. Finbarr Barry Flood has suggested that the perpetuation of the mihrab's arcaded decoration across several restorations indicates that the medieval restorations were aimed at preserving at least some of the original mihrab's appearance, and therefore the 8th-century Umayyad mihrab may have had these features.

Abbasid and Fatimid era

Following the toppling of the Umayyads in 750, the Abbasid dynasty came to power and moved the capital of the Caliphate to Baghdad. Apart from the attention given for strategic and commercial purposes, the Abbasids had no interest in Damascus. Thus, the Umayyad Mosque reportedly suffered under their rule, with little recorded building activity between the 8th and 10th centuries. However, the Abbasids did consider the mosque to be a major symbol of Islam's triumph, and thus it was spared the systematic eradication of the Umayyad legacy in the city. In 789–90 the Abbasid governor of Damascus, al-Fadl ibn Salih ibn Ali, constructed the Dome of the Treasury with the purpose of housing the mosque's funds. The so-called Dome of the Clock, standing in the eastern part of the courtyard, may have also been erected originally by the same Abbasid governor in 780. The 9th-century Jerusalemite geographer al-Muqaddasi credited the Abbasids for building the northern minaret (Madhanat al-Arous, meaning 'Minaret of the Bride') of the mosque in 831 during the reign of Caliph al-Ma'mun. This was accompanied by al-Ma'mun's removal and replacement of Umayyad inscriptions in the mosque.

By the early 10th century, a monumental water clock had been installed by the entrance in the western part of the southern wall of the mosque, which was consequently known as Bab al-Sa'a ('Gate of the Clock') at the time but is known today as Bab al-Ziyada. This clock seems to have stopped functioning by the middle of the 12th century. Abbasid rule over Syria began crumbling during the early 10th century, and in the decades that followed, it came under the control of autonomous realms who were only nominally under Abbasid authority. The Fatimids of Egypt, who adhered to Shia Islam, conquered Damascus in 970, but few recorded improvements of the mosque were undertaken by the new rulers. The Umayyad Mosque's prestige allowed the residents of Damascus to establish the city as a center for Sunni intellectualism, enabling them to maintain relative independence from Fatimid religious authority. In 1069, large sections of the mosque, particularly the northern wall, were destroyed in a fire as a result of an uprising by the city's residents against the Fatimids' Berber army who were garrisoned there.

Seljuk and Ayyubid era

The Sunni Muslim Seljuk Turks gained control of the city in 1078 and restored the nominal rule of the Abbasid Caliphate. The Seljuk ruler Tutush initiated the repair of damage caused by the 1069 fire. In 1082, his vizier, Abu Nasr Ahmad ibn Fadl, had the central dome restored in a more spectacular form; the two piers supporting it were reinforced and the original Umayyad mosaics of the northern inner façade were renewed. The northern riwaq ('portico') was rebuilt in 1089. The Seljuk atabeg of Damascus, Toghtekin, repaired the northern wall in 1110 and two inscribed panels located above its doorways were dedicated to him. In 1113, the Seljuk atabeg of Mosul, Sharaf al-Din Mawdud, was assassinated in the Umayyad Mosque. As the conflict between Damascus and the Crusaders intensified in the mid-12th century, the mosque was used as a principal rallying point calling on Muslims to defend the city and return Jerusalem to Muslim hands. Prominent imams, including Ibn Asakir, preached a spiritual jihad ('struggle') and when the Crusaders advanced towards Damascus in 1148, the city's residents heeded their calls; the Crusader army withdrew as a result of their resistance.

During the reign of the Zengid ruler Nur ad-Din Zangi, which began in 1154, a second monumental clock, the Jayrun Water Clock, was built on his personal orders. It was constructed outside the eastern entrance to the mosque, called Bab Jayrun, by the architect Muhammad al-Sa'ati, was rebuilt by al-Sa'ati following a fire in 1167, and was eventually repaired by his son, Ridwan, in the early 13th century. It may have survived into the 14th century. The Arab geographer al-Idrisi visited the mosque in 1154.

Damascus witnessed the establishment of several religious institutions under the Ayyubids, but the Umayyad Mosque retained its place as the center of religious life in the city. Muslim traveler Ibn Jubayr described the mosque as containing many different zawaya (religious lodges) for religious and Quranic studies. In 1173, the northern wall of the mosque was damaged again by the fire and was rebuilt by the Ayyubid sultan, Saladin (r. 1174–1193), along with the Minaret of the Bride, which had been destroyed in the 1069 fire. During the internal feuds between later Ayyubid princes, the city was dealt a great deal of damage, and the mosque's eastern minaret—known as the 'Minaret of Jesus'—was destroyed at the hands of as-Salih Ayyub of Egypt while besieging as-Salih Ismail of Damascus in 1245. The minaret was later rebuilt with little decoration. Saladin, along with many of his successors, were buried around the Umayyad Mosque (see Mausoleum of Saladin).

Mamluk era

The Mongols, under the leadership of the Nestorian Christian Kitbuqa, with the help of some submitted Western Christian forces, captured Damascus from the Ayyubids in 1260 while Kitbuqa's superior Hulagu Khan had returned to the Mongol Empire for other business. Bohemond VI of Antioch, one of the Western Christian generals in the invasion, ordered Catholic Mass to be performed in the Umayyad Mosque. However, the Muslim Mamluks of Egypt, led by Sultan Qutuz and Baibars, wrested control of the city from the Mongols later in the same year, killing Kitbuqa in the Battle of Ain Jalut, and the purpose of the Mosque was returned from Christian to its original Islamic function. In 1270, Baibars, by now sultan, ordered extensive restorations to the mosque, particularly its marble, mosaics and gildings. According to Baibars' biographer, Ibn Shaddad, the restorations cost the sultan 20,000 dinars. Among the largest mosaic fragments restored was a  segment in the western portico called the "Barada panel". The mosaics that decorated the mosque were a specific target of the restoration project and they had a major influence on Mamluk architecture in Syria and Egypt.

In 1285, the Hanbali scholar Ibn Taymiyyah started teaching Qur'an exegesis in the mosque. When the Ilkhanid Mongols under Ghazan invaded the city in 1300, Ibn Taymiyya preached jihad, urging the citizens of Damascus to resist their occupation. The Mamluks under Sultan Qalawun drove out the Mongols later that year. When Qalawun's forces entered the city, the Mongols attempted to station several catapults in the Umayyad Mosque because the Mamluks had started fires around the citadel to prevent Mongol access to it. The attempt failed as the Mamluks proceeded to burn the catapults before they were placed in the mosque.

The Mamluk viceroy of Syria, Tankiz, carried out restoration work in the mosque in 1326–1328. He reassembled the mosaics on the qibla wall and replaced all the marble tiles in the prayer hall. Sultan al-Nasir Muhammad also undertook major restoration work for the mosque in 1328. He demolished and completely rebuilt the unstable qibla wall and moved the Bab al-Ziyadah gate to the east. Much of that work was damaged during a fire that burned the mosque in 1339. Islamic art expert, Finbarr Barry Flood, describes the Bahri Mamluks' attitude towards the mosque as an "obsessive interest" and their efforts at maintaining, repairing, and restoring the mosque were unparalleled in any other period of Muslim rule. The Arab astronomer Ibn al-Shatir worked as the chief muwaqqit ('religious timekeeper') and the chief muezzin at the Umayyad Mosque from 1332 until he died in 1376. He erected a large sundial on the mosque's northern minaret in 1371, now lost. A replica was installed in its place in the modern period. The Minaret of Jesus was burnt down in a fire in 1392.

The Mongol conqueror Timur besieged Damascus in 1400. He ordered the burning of the city on 17 March 1401, and the fire ravaged the Umayyad Mosque. The eastern minaret was reduced to rubble, and the central dome collapsed. A southwestern minaret was added to the mosque in 1488 during the reign of Mamluk sultan Qaitbay.

Ottoman era

Damascus was conquered from the Mamluks by the Ottoman Empire under Sultan Selim I in 1516. The first Friday prayer performed in Selim's name in the Umayyad Mosque was attended by the sultan himself. The Ottomans used an endowment system (waqf) for religious sites as a means to link the local population with the central authority. The waqf of the Umayyad Mosque was the largest in the city, employing 596 people. Supervisory and clerical positions were reserved for Ottoman officials while religious offices were held mostly by members of the local ulema (Muslim scholars). Although the awqaf (plural of "waqf") were taxed, the waqf of the Umayyad Mosque was exempted from taxation. In 1518, the Ottoman governor of Damascus and supervisor of the mosque's waqf, Janbirdi al-Ghazali, had the mosque repaired and redecorated as part of his architectural reconstruction program for the city.

The prominent Sufi scholar Abd al-Ghani al-Nabulsi taught regularly at the Umayyad Mosque starting in 1661.

The khatib (preacher) of the Umayyad Mosque was one of the three most influential religious officials in Ottoman Damascus, the other two being the Hanafi mufti and the naqib al-ashraf. He served as a link between the imperial government in Constantinople and the elites of Damascus and was a key shaper of public opinion in the city. By 1650 members of the mercantile and scholarly Mahasini family held the position, retaining it for much of the 18th and early and mid-19th centuries, partly due to their links with the Shaykh al-Islam in the imperial capital. In the late 19th century, another Damascene family with connections in Constantinople, the Khatibs, vied for the position. After the death of the Mahasini preacher in 1869, a member of the Khatibs succeeded him.

The mosque's prayer hall was once again ravaged and partly destroyed by fire in 1893. A laborer engaging in repair work accidentally started the fire when he was smoking his nargila (water pipe). The fire destroyed the inner fabric of the prayer hall and caused the collapse of the mosque's central dome. The Ottomans fully restored the mosque, largely maintaining the original layout. The restoration process, which lasted nine years, did not attempt to reproduce the original decoration. The central mihrab was replaced and the dome was rebuilt in a contemporary Ottoman style. The rubble and damaged elements from the fire, including some of the original pillars and mosaic remains, were simply disposed of.

Until 1899 the mosque's library included the "very old" Qubbat al-Khazna collection; "most of its holdings were given to the German emperor Wilhelm II and only a few pieces kept for the National Archives in Damascus."

It is the burial place of the first three officers of the Ottoman Aviation Squadrons who died on mission, in this case the Istanbul-Cairo expedition in 1914. They were Navy Lieutenant Fethi Bey and his navigator, Artillery First Lieutenant Sadık Bey and Artillery Second Lieutenant Nuri Bey.

Modern era
The Umayyad Mosque underwent major restorations in 1929 during the French Mandate over Syria and in 1954 and 1963 under the Syrian Republic.

The methods and concepts of Assad's restoration project were heavily criticized by UNESCO, but the general approach in Syria was that the mosque was more of a symbolic monument rather than a historical one and thus, its renovation could only enhance the mosque's symbolism.

In , Mohammed Burhanuddin constructed a zarih of the martyrs of the Battle of Karbala, whose heads were brought to the Mosque after their defeat at the hands of the then Umayyad caliph, Yazid I.

In 2001, Pope John Paul II visited the mosque, primarily to visit the relics of John the Baptist. It was the first time a pope paid a visit to a mosque.

On March 15, 2011, the first significant protests related to the Syrian civil war began at the Umayyad Mosque when 40–50 worshipers gathered outside the complex and chanted pro-democracy slogans. Syrian security forces swiftly quelled the protests and have since cordoned off the area during Friday prayers to prevent large-scale demonstrations.

Architecture
A large courtyard occupies the northern part of the mosque complex, while the prayer hall or haram ('sanctuary') covers the southern part. The mosque is enclosed by four exterior walls which were part of the temenos of the original Roman temple.

Sanctuary
Three arcades make up the interior space of the sanctuary. They are parallel to the direction of prayer which is towards Mecca. The arcades are supported by two rows of stone Corinthian columns. Each of the arcades contain two levels. The first level consists of large semi-circular arches, while the second level is made up of double arches. This pattern is the same repeated by the arcades of the courtyard. The three interior arcades intersect in the center of the sanctuary with a larger, higher arcade that is perpendicular to the qibla wall and faces the mihrab and the minbar. The central transept divides the arcades into two halves each with eleven arches.

Four mihrabs line the sanctuary's rear wall, the main one being the Great Mihrab which is located roughly at the center of the wall. The Mihrab of the Sahaba, named after the sahaba ('companions of Muhammad') is situated in the eastern half. According to the 9th-century Muslim engineer Musa ibn Shakir, the latter mihrab was built during the mosque's initial construction and it became the third niche-formed mihrab in Islam's history.

The central dome of the mosque is known as the 'Dome of the Eagle' (Qubbat an-Nisr) and located atop the center of the prayer hall. The original wooden dome was replaced by one built of stone following the 1893 fire. It receives its name because it is thought to resemble an eagle, with the dome itself being the eagle's head while the eastern and western flanks of the prayer hall represent the wings. It is supported by the central interior arcade and has openings along its parameter.

Courtyard
In the courtyard (sahn), the level of the stone pavement had become uneven over time due to several repairs throughout the mosque's history. Recent work on the courtyard has restored it to its consistent Umayyad-era levels. Arcades (riwaq) surround the courtyard supported by alternating stone columns and piers. There is one pier in between every two columns. Because the northern part of the courtyard had been destroyed in an earthquake in 1759, the arcade is not consistent; when the northern wall was rebuilt the columns that were supporting it were not. The courtyard and its arcades contain the largest preserved remnants of the mosque's Umayyad-era mosaic decoration.

Several domed pavilions stand in the courtyard. The Dome of the Treasury is an octagonal structure decorated with mosaics, standing on eight Roman columns in the western part of the courtyard. Its 8th-century mosaics were largely remade in the late 20th-century restoration. In a mirror position on the other side of the courtyard is the Dome of the Clock, another octagonal domed pavilion. Near the middle of the courtyard, sheltering an ablutions fountain at ground level, is a rectangular pavilion which is a modern reconstruction of a late Ottoman pavilion.

Minarets
Within the Umayyad Mosque complex are three minarets. The Minaret of Isa on the southeast corner, the Minaret of Qaytbay (also called Madhanat al-Gharbiyya) on the southwest corner, and the Minaret of the Bride located along the northern wall.

Minaret of the Bride
The Minaret of the Bride was the first one built and is located on the mosque's northern wall. The exact year of the minaret's original construction is unknown. The bottom part of the minaret most likely dates back to the Abbasid era in the 9th century. While it is possible that the Umayyads built it, there is no indication that a minaret on the northern wall was a part of al-Walid I's initial concept. Al-Muqaddasi visited the minaret in 985 when Damascus was under Abbasid control and described it as "recently built". The upper segment was constructed in 1174. This minaret is used by the muezzin for the call to prayer (adhan) and there is a spiral staircase of 160 stone steps that lead to the muezzins calling position.

The Minaret of the Bride is divided into two sections; the main tower and the spire which are separated by a lead roof. The oldest part of the minaret, or the main tower, is square in shape, has four galleries, and consists of two different forms of masonry; the base consists of large blocks, while the upper section is built of dressed stone. There are two light openings near the top of the main tower, before the roof, with horseshoe arches and cubical capitals enclosed in a single arch. A smaller arched corbel is located below these openings. According to local legend, the minaret is named after the daughter of the merchant who provided the lead for the minaret's roof who was married to Syria's ruler at the time. Attached to the Minaret of the Bride is the 18th-century replica of the 14th-century sundial built by Ibn al-Shatir.

Minaret of Isa
Some sources claim it was originally built by the Abbasids in the 9th century. The main body of the current minaret was built by the Ayyubids in 1247, but the upper section was constructed by the Ottomans. The main body of the minaret is square-shaped and the spire is octagonal. It tapers to a point and is surmounted by a crescent (as are the other two minarets.) Two covered galleries are situated in the main body and two open galleries are located on the spire. Islamic belief holds that Isa (Jesus) will descend from heaven during the time of the Fajr prayer and will pray behind the Mahdi. He will then confront the Antichrist. According to local Damascene tradition, relating from hadith, Isa will reach earth via the Minaret of Isa, hence its name. Ibn Kathir, a prominent 14th-century Muslim scholar, backed this notion. 

Minaret of Qaytbay
The Minaret of Qaytbay, or the Western Minaret, was built by Qaytbay in 1488. He also commissioned it's renovation due to the 1479 fire. The minaret displays strong Islamic-era Egyptian architectural influence typical of the Mamluk period. It is octagonal in shape and built in receding sections with three galleries. It is generally believed that both the Minaret of Jesus and the Western Minaret were built on the foundation of ancient Roman towers. 

Influence on mosque architecture
The Umayyad Mosque is one of the few early mosques in the world to have maintained the same general structure and architectural features since its initial construction in the early 8th century. Its Umayyad character has not been significantly altered. Since its establishment, the mosque has served as a model for congregational mosque architecture in Syria as well as globally. According to Flood, "the construction of the Damascus mosque not only irrevocably altered the urban landscape of the city, inscribing upon it a permanent affirmation of Muslim hegemony, but by giving the Syrian congregational mosque its definitive form it also transformed the subsequent history of the mosque in general." Examples of the Umayyad Mosque's ground plan being used as a prototype for other mosques in the region include the al-Azhar Mosque and Baybars Mosque in Cairo, the Great Mosque of Cordoba in Spain, and the Bursa Grand Mosque and the Selimiye Mosque in Turkey.

Religious significance

The mosque is the fourth holiest site of Islam. A Christian tradition dating to the 6th century developed an association between the former cathedral structure and John the Baptist. Legend had it that his head was buried there. Ibn al-Faqih relays that during the construction of the mosque, workers found a cave-chapel which had a box containing the head of John the Baptist, known as Yahya ibn Zakariya by Muslims. Upon learning of that and examining it, al-Walid I ordered the head buried under a specific pillar in the mosque that was later inlaid with marble.

Muslim tradition holds that the mosque will be the place Jesus will return before the End of Days.

It holds great significance to Shia and Sunni Muslims, as this was the destination of the ladies and children of the family of Muhammad, made to walk here from Iraq, following the Battle of Karbala. Furthermore, it was the place where they were imprisoned for 60 days. Two shrines commemorating the Islamic prophet Muhammad's grandson Husayn ibn Ali, whose martyrdom is frequently compared to that of John the Baptist, and Jesus, exist within the building premises.

The following are structures found within the Mosque that bear great importance:West Side: The entrance gate (known as "Bāb as-Sā'at") — The door marks the location where the prisoners of Karbalā were made to stand for 72 hours before being brought inside. During this time, Yazīd I had the town and his palace decorated for their arrival.,South Wing (main hall): Shrine of John the Baptist — According to Al-Suyuti, Ibrahim stated that since the creation of the world the Heavens and the Earth wept only for two people: Yahya and Husayn ibn Ali, the grandson of Muhammad
 A white pulpit — Marks the place where Ali ibn Husayn Zayn al-Abidin addressed the court of Yazīd after being brought from Karbalā
 Raised floor (in front of the pulpit) — Marks the location where all the ladies and children (the household of Muhammad) were made to stand in the presence of Yazīd
 Wooden balcony (directly opposite the raised floor) – Marks the location where Yazīd sat in the court.East Wing:'''
 A prayer rug and Mihrāb encased in a glass cubicle — Marks the place where Ali ibn Husayn Zayn al-Abidin used to pray while imprisoned in the castle after the Battle of Karbala
 A metallic, cuboidal indentation in the wall — Marks the place where the head of Husayn ibn Ali was kept for display by Yazīd
 A Zarih'' — Marks the place where all the other heads of those who fell in Karbalā were kept within the Mosque.

See also

 Ablaq
 Great Mosque of Aleppo
 List of the oldest mosques in the world
 Religious significance of the Syrian region
 Timeline of Islamic history
 History of medieval Arabic and Western European domes

Notes

References

Bibliography

 (Ibn Jubayr: p. 240 ff)

External links

Christian Sahner, "A Glistening Crossroads," The Wall Street Journal, 17 July 2010 
For freely downloadable, high-resolution photographs of the Umayyad Mosque (for teaching, research, cultural heritage work, and publication) by archaeologists, visit Manar al-Athar 
Umayyad Mosque - Discover Islamic Art - Virtual Museum

Religious buildings and structures completed in 715
8th-century mosques
Islamic shrines
Umayyad architecture in Syria
Religious buildings and structures converted into mosques
Religious organizations established in the 8th century
Mausoleums in Syria
Mosques in Damascus
Buildings and structures inside the walled city of Damascus
Christian pilgrimages
John the Baptist
Libraries in Syria
8th-century establishments in the Umayyad Caliphate
Mosques converted from churches